Mahfuz (or Mohammed) (Harari: መሕፉዝ, ; died July 1517) was a Harari Garad, Emir of Harar and Governor of Zeila in the Adal Sultanate.

Life and reign
Mahfuz led raids into the provinces of Abyssinia for a number of years. He selected the season of Lent for his attacks, when the defenders were weakened by their fasts. He invaded the Amhara, Shewa, and Fatagar provinces south of the Awash River. According to Portuguese explorer Francisco Álvares, Mahfuz exclusively targeted Abyssinian soldiers capturing them however left civilians unharmed.

Sources differ over the number of years Mahfuz raided Abyssinia. Francisco Álvares states that his raids began during the reign of Eskender, and lasted 25 years. However, Beckingham and Huntingford note that the Ethiopian Paris Chronicle, which draws on contemporary Ethiopian records, dates the beginning of these raids to the ascension of Dawit II (Lebna Dengel) in 1508. Mahfuz is reported to have caused the deaths of Ethiopian Emperors Na'od and Eskender.

Upon reaching the age of majority, Emperor Lebna Dengel decided to forgo his observance of Lent and oppose the Imam in battle, despite the advice and wishes of his councilors and people. He sent spies out to determine Imam Mahfuz's plans for that year, and learning the Imam was in Fatagar led his army there. He found Imam Mahfuz with the sultan of Adal encamped on a plain that was surrounded by mountains. After first sending soldiers out to secure the passes, the Abyssinian Emperor closed upon Imam Mahfuz.

Although Imam Mahfuz managed to enable Sultan Muhammed to escape with but four horsemen, according to Alvarez, Imam Mafhuz knew he was trapped and sought to die with honor. He called to the Abyssinians a challenge to fight in single combat, and Gabra Endreyas, who had been a follower of Emperor Lebna Dengel's father, accepted and killed the Imam. Mahfuz's head was cut from his body and displayed publicly in the Emperor's court. After defeating Mahfuz, Dawit II used appellation Wanag Segad, which is a combination of Ge'ez and Harari terms. Ahmed ibn Ibrahim al-Ghazi later in his invasion of Abyssinia would kill an old Gabra as revenge for his victory against Mahfuz.

Legacy
Mahfuz' daughter, Bati del Wambara, married Imam Ahmad ibn Ibrahim al-Ghazi of the Adal Sultanate. Ten years after Mahfuz's death, Al-Ghazi embarked on a Conquest of Abyssinia (Futuh al-Habash).

See also
Ahmad ibn Ibrahim al-Ghazi

Notes and references

1517 deaths
Military personnel killed in action
People from the Adal Sultanate
Year of birth unknown